Harry Jepson "Hoot" Haines (February 25, 1907 - August 17, 1968) was an American professional football player who spent two seasons in the National Football League with the Brooklyn Dodgers from 1930 to 1931, and the Staten Island Stapletons in 1931. Hains played in a total of 17 career games, and made 10 starts.

References

1907 births
1968 deaths
Brooklyn Dodgers (NFL) players
Staten Island Stapletons players